Willi Billmann (15 January 1911 – 5 July 2001) was a German international footballer.

International career 
He won 11 caps between 1937 and 1941 for the Germany national team.

References

External links
 
 
 

1911 births
2001 deaths
Association football defenders
German footballers
Germany international footballers
1. FC Nürnberg players
Hertha BSC players
Footballers from Nuremberg